Alix Kerr Liddell  (10 May 1907 – 6 July 1981) was a British writer who contributed to the Guiding and Girl Scouting movement both in the United Kingdom and internationally. She wrote several books on the history of Guiding.

Family
Alix Liddell was the daughter of Rose Kerr, a pioneer of Girl Guiding, and Admiral Mark Kerr, British Navy. Her great-grandfather was the 6th Marquess of Lothian. On 28 July 1937 she married Maurice Arthur Liddell, OBE (1905–1976) a nephew of Alice Liddell of Alice in Wonderland fame. They had two children: Virginia Sarah Alix Ashton (born 16 September 1941) and Judith Rose Jackson (born 2 October 1944)

Guiding and Scouting
The Kerr family were personal friends of Olave and Robert Baden-Powell and Liddell's mother was heavily involved in Guiding. Liddell began her life in Guiding as a Brownie. She attended the first International Camp in Normandy in 1922. Later she became both a Guider and a Commissioner.

She held numerous positions at national level within UK Guiding including Chairman of Publications Committee, International Commissioner and member of the Education Panel. She attended nine of the ten World Conferences between 1950 and 1975.

Liddell produced numerous books on Guiding, including several on the history of the movement. She was editor of The Council Fire, a World Association of Girl Guides and Girl Scouts (WAGGGS) publication, for nearly 30 years. Liddell was awarded the Silver Fish.

Works
1948: International Notebook – Europe
1954: Story of the Girl Guides: 1908–1938 (Revised by Liddell)
1957:  The True Book about Girl Guides
1960: The First Fifty Years
(1965?): The Story of Our Chalet, Olave House, Our Cabaña (with Ida von Herrenschwand and Ethel Rusk Dermady)
1970: The Girl Guides, 1910–1970
(1976?): Briefly it's Guides
1976: Story of the Girl Guides: 1938 – 1975

See also

Elizabeth Hartley

References

1907 births
1981 deaths
Girlguiding
International Scouting leaders
Officers of the Order of the British Empire
Recipients of the Silver Fish Award
People from Pimlico
Writers from London